Black Summer may refer to:

 Black Summer, a comic book series published by Avatar Press from 2007–2008
 Black Summer (aka Rhys Toms), an Australian music producer and DJ
 Black Summer (TV series), American streaming television series released in 2019
 The 2019–20 Australian bushfire season, often referred to colloquially as the "Black summer bushfires"
 "Black Summer" (song), a 2022 song by the Red Hot Chili Peppers